

Leaders of Gazankulu
(Dates in italics indicate de facto continuation of office)

Political affiliation
XPP – Ximoko Progressive Party

See also
Bantustan
President of South Africa
State President of South Africa
List of prime ministers of South Africa
Governor-General of the Union of South Africa
Apartheid
List of historical unrecognized states and dependencies

Gazankulu
Gazankulu, Chief Ministers
Gazankulu, Chief Ministers
Gazankulu